The Big Mosque in Poonamallee, a suburb of Chennai, India was constructed during the rule of the Golconda Sultanate by Rustam, son of a Golconda courtier named Astirabad Dhulfiqar. The mosque constructed in 1653 was the first in Tamil Nadu to be built in the Indo-Saracenic style.
The mosque purely follows the principles of Ahle Sunnath-Wal-Jama'th.

References 
 

Mosques in Chennai
Mosques completed in 1653
Tiruvallur district